Toussaint de Forbin-Janson also known simply as Cardinal de Janson (1 October 1631 – 24 March 1713) was a French Catholic Cardinal and Bishop of Beauvais.

Early life

As a boy, Janson joined the Knights of Malta and then the army of the Kingdom of France (as was the custom). But he left the army in his late teens and went to study letters.

Ecclesiastic career

Soon after, he was ordained and at the age of 21 was appointed coadjutor bishop in support of his uncle, the Bishop of Digne. He was appointed titular bishop of Filadelfia in 1655 and was forced to leave the Knights of Malta. He succeeded his uncle as Bishop of Digne in 1664 and in 1668 he transferred to become Bishop of Marseille. In 1679 he became Bishop of Beauvais.

In 1673, King Louis XIV of France sent Janson to Tuscany to repair his relationship with his cousin, Marguerite Louise d'Orléans, wife of Cosimo III de' Medici, Grand Duke of Tuscany. Thereafter he was appointed Ambassador Extraordinary of France to Poland and then to the Netherlands.

Janson announced his support for the Gallican proposals at the 1682 Assembly in Paris. As a result, Pope Innocent XI refused to elevate Janson to the cardinalate. Innocent XI died seven years later in 1689.

Cardinalate

In February 1690, the newly elected Pope Alexander VIII elevated Janson to cardinal and appointed him cardinal-priest of the church of Sant'Agnese fuori le mura in July of that year. Upon his elevation Janson announced that he would be formally adopting the name Cardinal de Janson to differentiate himself from his brother, the Marquis du Forbin-Janson.

A number of cardinals still resented the position Janson had taken at the Paris assembly, but the Pope insisted Janson had been forgiven for past errors.

Episcopal succession

References

Toussaint de Forbin
1631 births
1713 deaths
17th-century French cardinals
Cardinals created by Pope Alexander VIII
17th-century French diplomats
Ambassadors of France to Poland
18th-century French cardinals
17th-century peers of France
18th-century peers of France